Extravagance is a 1916 silent film comedy drama directed by Burton L. King and based on a play by Aaron Hoffman. It stars Olga Petrova sometimes billed as Madame Olga Petrova. Produced by Popular Plays and Players, it was distributed through Metro Pictures.

Cast
Madame Olga Petrova as Norma Russell
H. Cooper Cliffe as Courtland Russell
Mahlon Hamilton as Franklin Hall
Arthur Hoops as Howard Dundore
J. W. Hartman as Horace Short
Edward Martindel as Robert Mackay
Tom Cameron as Butler

Preservation status
A print survives at Cinémathèque Québécoise, Montreal.

References

External links

1916 films
American silent feature films
Films directed by Burton L. King
American films based on plays
American black-and-white films
1916 comedy-drama films
Metro Pictures films
1910s American films
Silent American comedy-drama films
1910s English-language films